Bezerra is a Portuguese surname of Hebrew ancestry, popular among the Sephardi Jewish settlers in Northern Portugal. The name translates to 'heifer'.
The first members of this family have origins in Ponte de Lima, the oldest Portuguese village, and can be traced back to the century XII.

By the early early 1500s, Jews in Portugal were told that they had either to convert to Catholicism or leave the country, and while many converted by choice and embraced their new faith, others were faced with forced conversions, which led to false adherence to Catholicism in public with continued observance of Judaism in private (also known as Crypto-Jews, or "Jews without a past"). These converted Jews were commonly called 'New Christians', 'Marranos' or 'Conversos'. The Bezerra family name has been historically recognized as a 'converso' lineage of ethnic Jews converted to the Catholic Church.

The 'conversos', although remaining as Portuguese subjects, but eager to escape to as far as possible from the Portuguese Inquisition, started leaving Portugal for other countries.

The 'conversos' Antonio Martins Bezerra and his wife Maria Martins Bezerra were amongst the first Portuguese settlers in Brazil, having arrived to the then newly acquired colony in 1535.
Nowadays, people with the Bezerra surname are found mostly in the Northeast of Brazil .

Famous People 
Famous people bearing this surname include:
Juan Bautista de Anza Bezerra Nieto (1736–1788), Novo-Spanish explorer
Edir Macedo Bezerra (born 1945), Brazilian Billionaire entrepreneur
Eliana Michaelichen Bezerra (born 1973), Brazilian TV host
Toninho — Antonio Bezerra Brandão (born 1977), Brazilian footballer
Rosembrick José Bezerra de Lira (born 1979), Brazilian footballer
Selmir dos Santos Bezerra (born 1979), Brazilian footballer
Ed Benes — José Edilbenes Bezerra (born 1972), Brazilian comics book artist
Kaká — Claudiano Bezerra da Silva (born 1981), Brazilian footballer
Paulinho — José Paulo Bezerra Maciel Júnior (born 1988), Brazilian footballer
José Bezerra da Silva (1927–2005), Brazilian samba singer
José Bezerra Coutinho (1910–2008), Brazilian Catholic Bishop 
Oscar Schmidt (born 1958), retired Brazilian basketball player
Teodorico Bezerra (1903–1994), Brazilian, landowner, entrepreneur and politician (page in Portuguese)
Fernando Bezerra (born 1941), Brazilian entrepreneur and politician (page in Portuguese)
Bezerra de Menezes (1831–1900), Brazilian physician, journalist, politician and book writer (page in Portuguese)
Christal Bezerra (born 2004), Brazilian Gymnast
Zila Bezerra (born 1945), Brazilian teacher and politician
Fátima Bezerra (born 1955), Brazilian politician, former Senator and currently Governor of the state of Rio Grande do Norte
Victor Bezerra (born 2005), American footballer

References